North East Live is a 24-hour satellite news channel of Assam, India broadcasting in English and Hindi, mainly focusing on the  North-East India. Northeast Live is the first satellite English news channel covering the eight states of the Northeast. It was launched on 30 September 2013 in Arunachal Pradesh by Chief Minister Nabam Tuki in the presence of Development of North East Region (DoNER) Minister Paban Singh Ghatowar.
It is owned by Pride East Entertainments Pvt. Ltd. of Guwahati, Assam. It is a sister channel of popular Assamese news channel News Live, Rang, Ramdhenu and Indradhanu.
The channel comprises senior journalist Wasbir Hussain as editor-in-chief.

Programming
Hero ISL 2018
Good Morning Northeast
Khabar 9 Baje
NE Kitchen
Good Life: The Health Show
Sports Zone
E-Time
Khabar Dopahar
Afternoon Headlines
Talk Time
Samachar Northeast
Evening Prime
Northeast Tonight
Region Diary

References

External links
Official website

Television stations in Guwahati
24-hour television news channels in India
Television channels and stations established in 2013
Mass media in Assam
Pride East Entertainments